Girolamo Michelangelo Grigoletti (29 August 1801 – 11 February 1870) was an Italian painter, active in a Neoclassical style.

Biography
Born at Pordenone to a humble family, he was encouraged by an uncle priest who arranged for him to enroll in the Accademia di Belle Arti of Venice, where he was a colleague of Lodovico Lipparino.  Among his masterworks are Lucia at the feet of the Unnamed (from an episode in Manzoni's novel I Promesi Sposi), Erminia seeing Tancredi fall bleeding from his saddle, Venetian doge Francesco Foscari bids farewell to his son Jacopo, the Education of the Virgin in the Sant'Antonio Taumaturgo, Trieste and the Assumption of the Virgin for the Basilica of Esztergom in Hungary.

He was named professor at the Academy, and among his pupils were  Giacomo Favretto, Cesare Dell'Acqua, Antonio Dugoni, Frederick Zandomeneghi, Tranquillo Cremona, Eugenio Prati, Gian Battista Carrer,  and Eugenio Scomparini. A school in Pordenone is titled ''"Liceo Scientifico Statale Michelangelo Grigoletti". He died in Venice, aged 68.

References

1801 births
1870 deaths
19th-century Italian painters
19th-century Italian male artists
Italian male painters
Painters from Venice
Accademia di Belle Arti di Venezia alumni
Academic staff of the Accademia di Belle Arti di Venezia